Papilio melonius is a species of swallowtail butterfly from the genus Papilio that is found in Jamaica.

References

melonius
Butterflies described in 1906
Papilionidae of South America